Contusus is a genus of pufferfishes native to the coastal waters of southern Australia and New Zealand.

Species
There are currently two recognized species in this genus:
 Contusus brevicaudus Hardy, 1981
 Contusus richei (Fréminville, 1813) (Prickly toadfish)

References

Tetraodontidae
Marine fish genera
Taxa named by Gilbert Percy Whitley